Emanuel Schäfer (20 April 1900 – 4 December 1974) was a high-ranking SS functionary (SS-Oberführer) and a protégé of Reinhard Heydrich in Nazi Germany.

Born in 1900, Schäfer served in World War I. Post-war, he participated in far-right Freikorps groups such as the Marinebrigade Ehrhardt and from 1925–28, Der Stahlhelm (The Steel helmet).

Schäfer joined the paramilitary Sturmabteilung (SA) in 1933. He was an active member of the Sicherheitsdienst (SD), the SS security service, in 1933, and entered the SS in September 1936.

During World War II, Schäfer was head of the Nazi security police in Serbia. Between January and May 1942, Schäfer supervised the murder by gassing of around 7,300 Jews from the Semlin camp across the Sava river from Belgrade. A Saurer gas van was used to kill the 7,300. A further 1,200 Jews died as a result of the camp's harsh conditions, or from executions. The van was used for the last time on 10 May 1942. In May 1942, Schäfer sent a cable to the Reich Security Main Office boasting "with pride" that "Belgrade was the only great city in Europe that was free of Jews."

After the war, Schäfer was briefly detained by U.S. occupation authorities. In February 1951, he was arrested by West German authorities for his Gestapo and SD membership. On 20 June 1951, Schäfer was sentenced to 21 months in prison by a denazification court. He was released from prison in February 1953. Schäfer was then re-arrested for his involvement in mass murder as an Einsatzkommando. On 20 June 1953, Schäfer was sentenced to 6.5 years in prison for over 5000 counts of being an accessory to murder and two counts of being an accessory to manslaughter. He was released from prison early in 1956. Schäfer died in 1974.

References 

1900 births
1974 deaths
People from Hlučín
20th-century Freikorps personnel
German Army personnel of World War I
Nazi Party officials
SS-Oberführer
Nazis convicted of war crimes
People from the Province of Silesia
Holocaust perpetrators in Yugoslavia
Sturmabteilung personnel
Einsatzgruppen personnel
Serbia in World War II
Jewish Serbian history
German police chiefs
Prisoners and detainees of the United States military